The 412th Theater Engineer Command (412th TEC) is a United States Army Reserve unit that conducts theater-level engineer operations for Eighth U.S. Army, Korea; U.S. Army Europe; and U.S. Army Pacific, supports continental U.S. – based engineer requirements as directed, and is prepared to participate in Joint and Combined regional contingency operations.

History
The 412th Engineer Command provides theater-level engineer support to the Combatant Commander in the event of a contingency operation. It is designed to command hundreds of engineer units and thousands of Soldiers in a war fighting capacity. The Command has historical training relationships in the Pacific and European theaters, and provides direct support to the Eighth US Army in Korea. The Command also is the Army Reserve's Executive Agent for Operation Sand Castle at Fort Irwin, CA, which is a 10-year urban terrain construction mission for engineer units conducting their Annual Training. Prior to mobilization, the 412th ENCOM is under operational control of the Headquarters, U.S. Army Corps of Engineers.

As an operational command, the 412th has 3 brigades and 96 other assigned units with approximately 10,000 Soldiers located throughout the southeast and northeast U.S. These units include the 926th Engineer Brigade, 411th Engineer Brigade, 302d Maneuver Enhancement Brigade, and the 314th Public Affairs Detachment (Press Camp Headquarters).

The Command was formed in the Organized Reserves in 1923, and served in World War II, earning the Meritorious Unit Commendation. In the 1990s, the 412th participated in Operation Joint Endeavor and Operation Joint Forge in Bosnia and Kosovo, and as part of the Hungary Joint Task Force East in several former Warsaw Pact and Soviet countries.
412th Soldiers have assisted with construction missions and supported joint exercises in Thailand, the Philippines, Vietnam, and the Marshall Islands. During the East Timor crisis in 2002, Soldiers from the 412th provided engineer support to the UN.

The 412th headquarters has deployed numerous detachments since the beginning of the Global War on Terror. In 2003, a detachment deployed as the Engineer Section for the Headquarters, U.S. Army Europe. In 2004, the CG and a small detachment supported the Multi-National Force in Baghdad. In 2005, the 412th deployed a design management section to support the 130th Engineer Brigade in Iraq. In 2006 and 2008, the 412th deployed task forces to augment the Gulf Region Division of the Corps of Engineers in Iraq. Currently, more than 800 of its Soldiers have deployed to Iraq. In 2009–2010, DCP 1 deployed to Afghanistan as part of Operation Enduring Freedom. The 412th provided engineering and logistical support for hurricane relief after Hurricane Katrina and Hurricane Rita devastated the Louisiana and Mississippi coasts in the late summer of 2005.

Current Structure 
The current structure of the brigade, as of 2020, is as follows:

 412th Engineer Command, in Vicksburg, Mississippi
 20th Military History Detachment, in Chattanooga, Tennessee
 23rd Military History Detachment, in Chattanooga, Tennessee
 322nd Military History Detachment, in Birmingham, Alabama
 338th Forward Engineer Support Team, in Montgomery, Alabama
 608th Engineer Detachment, in Vicksburg, Mississippi
 206th LND, at Fort Jackson, South Carolina
 207th Army Liaison Support Detachment, at Fort Bragg, North Carolina
 411th Engineer Brigade, in New Windsor, New York
 365th Engineer Battalion, in Schuylkill Haven, Pennsylvania
 458th Engineer Battalion, in Johnstown, Pennsylvania
 463rd Engineer Battalion, in Wheeling, West Virginia
 479th Engineer Battalion, at Fort Drum, New York
 854th Engineer Battalion, in Kingston, New York
 926th Engineer Brigade, in Montgomery, Alabama
 391st Engineer Battalion, in Greenville, South Carolina
 467th Engineer Battalion, in Millington, Tennessee
 478th Engineer Battalion, in Fort Thomas, Kentucky
 841st Engineer Battalion, in Miami, Florida
 844th Engineer Battalion, in Knoxville, Tennessee
 926th Engineer Battalion, in Birmingham, Alabama
 302nd Maneuver Enhancement Brigade, in Chicopee, Massachusetts
 368th Engineer Battalion, in Londonderry, New Hampshire
 479th Chemical Battalion, in Far Rockaway, New York
 533rd Combat Support Battalion, at Fort Totten, New York
 382nd Military Police Battalion, at Westover Air Reserve Base, Massachusetts

Lineage
Constituted in July 1923 in the Organized Reserves as the 372nd Engineer Regiment.

Organized in November 1924

Redesignated 1 August 1942 as the 372nd Engineer General Service Regiment.

Ordered into active military service 20 December 1942 at Camp Claiborne, Louisiana'

Departed CONUS 14 August 1943

Arrived in England on 21 August 1943

Deployed to France 9 October 1944, and immediately entered Rhineland Campaign already in progress.

Unit disengaged from Rhineland Campaign to support Ardennes-Alsace Campaign on 16 December 1944.

Ardennes-Alsace Campaign concluded on 25 January 1945, and unit resumed engagement in Rhineland Campaign.

Rhineland Campaign concluded on 21 March 1945

Unit engaged in Central Europe Campaign on 22 March 1945

Unit Invaded Germany on 4 April 1945

Central Europe Campaign concluded on 11 May 1945

Returned to CONUS on 2 July 1945, and located at Fort Belvoir, Virginia.

Unit located at Fort Belvoir on 14 August 1945

Unit Inactivated 25 October 1945 at Fort Belvoir, Virginia

Headquarters and Headquarters and Service Company activated 14 November 1947 at Missoula, Montana

Organized Reserves redesignated 25 March 1948 as the Organized Reserve Corps

Unit Inactivated 11 February 1949 at Missoula, Montana

Headquarters and Headquarters and Service Company redesignated 3 May 1949 as Headquarters and Headquarters Company, 412th Engineer Brigade, and activated at Vicksburg, Mississippi

Organized Reserve Corps; redesignated 9 July 1952 as the Army Reserve

Unit reorganized and redesignated 15 January 1968 as Headquarters and Headquarters Company, 412th Engineer Command

Elements ordered into active military service in stages between 17 May 1996 and 1 December 1996 at Vicksburg, Mississippi.

Unit Released from active military service 10 February 1997 and reverted to reserve status

Elements ordered into active military service in stages between 2003 and 2010 in support of the Global War on Terror

Insignia

Shoulder sleeve insignia
Symbolism:
Scarlet and white are the Engineer's colors.
The blue area denotes the Mississippi Valley affiliation and the crenellated red bars are reminiscent of the Engineer's castle, alluding to bridges and construction for which the Corps of Engineers is responsible.
Background:
The shoulder sleeve insignia was originally approved for the 412th Engineer Brigade on 8 November 1967.
It was redesignated for the 412th Engineer Command on 5 February 1968.

Distinctive unit insignia
Description: A gold color metal and enamel device 1 1/8 (2.86 cm) inches in height overall consisting of a modified white keystone bearing throughout a vertical blue bar concave on each side charged with a white fleur-de-lis within; overall, a gold wreath, enclosing all, at the top a gold castle wall with three projections, and a red scroll inscribed at the sides and base "BUILD TO SERVE" in gold letters.
Symbolism: Scarlet and white are the colors for the Corps of Engineers. The fleur-de-lis within the laurel wreath refers to the historic World War II action for which the organization was awarded the Meritorious Unit Commendation, European Theater; and the embattled castle wall connotes the construction responsibilities of the Engineers.
Background: The distinctive unit insignia was approved on 1 May 1975.

Honors

Campaign participation credit
World War II:
Rhineland,
Ardennes-Alsace,
Central Europe
War On Terror:
To Be Determined.

Decorations
 Meritorious Unit Commendation (Army) Streamer embroidered EUROPEAN THEATER
War on Terrorism
 Army Superior Unit Award – Order #: 308-04 – Period of Service: 1 July 2006 to 1 October 2007

References

External links
412th Engineer Command Homepage

412
412
412
Military units and formations established in 1924